Pressburger is a surname. Notable people with the surname include:

 Abrahám Pressburger, Jewish Czech partisan during World War II
 Arnold Pressburger (1885–1951), Austrian film producer
 Emeric Pressburger (1902–1988), Hungarian-British screenwriter, film director, and producer
 Giorgio Pressburger (1937–2017), Italian writer of novels and short stories
 Michoel Pressburger, Austrian haredi rabbi

See also 
 Mojżesz Presburger (1904–1943), Jewish Polish mathematician, logician, and philosopher
 Presburger arithmetic, the first-order theory of the natural numbers with addition
 Bratislava Castle, or Pressburger Schloss in German
 Pressburg Yeshiva (disambiguation)